The Sam Taub Award is a yearly award presented by the Boxing Writers Association of America for Excellence in Broadcasting Journalism. The award is named after Sam Taub, a journalist and radio broadcaster who is best known for his work covering boxing. It is similar to Major League Baseball's Ford C. Frick Award.

Winners
1982 -- Don Dunphy
1983 -- Gil Clancy
1984 -- John F.X. Condon
1985 -- Larry Merchant
1986 -- Tim Ryan
1987 -- Alex Wallau
1988 -- Al Bernstein
1989 -- Sam Rosen
1990 -- Ross Greenburg
1991 -- Reg Gutteridge
1992 -- Jim Lampley and Barry Tompkins
1993 -- Bob Yalen
1994—No winner
1995 -- Al Albert and Sean O'Grady
1996—No winner
1997 -- Dave Bontempo
1998 -- Bob Sheridan
1999—No winner
2000—No winner
2001 -- Teddy Atlas
2002 -- Steve Farhood
2003 -- Bernardo Osuna
2004 -- Brian Kenny
2005 -- Jay Larkin and Rich Marotta
2006 -- Steve Albert
2007 -- Nick Charles
2008 -- Harold Lederman
2009 -- Joe Tessitore
2010—No winner
2011—No winner
2012 -- Max Kellerman
2013 -- Paulie Malignaggi
2014 -- Seth Abraham
2015—Marc Payton, Mark Taffet
2016—Gordon Hall
2017 –– Lou DiBella
2018 –– Stephen Espinoza
2019 –– Andre Ward

References

Boxing awards